Raúl Aarón Pozos Lanz (born 30 June 1967) is a Mexican politician affiliated with the PRI. He currently serves as Senator of the LXII Legislature of the Mexican Congress representing Campeche.

References

1967 births
Living people
Institutional Revolutionary Party politicians
Members of the Senate of the Republic (Mexico)
Politicians from Campeche
21st-century Mexican politicians
Members of the Congress of Campeche
Autonomous University of Campeche alumni
Universidad Anáhuac México alumni